"So Yesterday" is a song by American singer Hilary Duff for her second studio album, Metamorphosis (2003). It was written and produced by The Matrix (a production team consisting of Lauren Christy, Scott Spock and Graham Edwards), with additional writing from Charlie Midnight. The song is influenced by pop rock music, and the lyrics chronicle the protagonist getting over a breakup with her boyfriend, declaring him as "so yesterday". The song received mixed to positive reviews from music critics, with some of them noting its close similarity to Avril Lavigne's works, while others named it one of Duff's best songs.

"So Yesterday" premiered on AOL Music's "First Listen" on June 27, 2003. It was serviced to mainstream radio in the United States on July 14, 2003. The song became Duff's first single to chart in the US Billboard Hot 100 where it reached number 42. It was more successful outside the US, reaching the top 40 in most countries it charted, peaking at number two in Canada, number eight in Australia and France, and number nine in the United Kingdom; in Australia the song was certified platinum.

The song was accompanied by a music video, directed by Chris Applebaum, which showed Duff playing a prank on her ex-boyfriend. It was successful on various music video channels like MTV and MuchMusic. Duff performed the song on her Metamorphosis Tour and has since performed it on all her concert tours. The song is also featured on the compilations Most Wanted (2005), 4Ever Hilary (2006) and Best of Hilary Duff (2008), and the music video game Band Hero.

Background and release
Although Duff recorded songs like "I Can't Wait", "Why Not" and "What Dreams Are Made Of", which received substantial airplay on Radio Disney, executives at Buena Vista Music Group, Duff's record label, planned to help her reach a more mature audience. So, Andre Recke, an executive at Buena Vista, along with Duff and her mother, enlisted the songwriting and production team "The Matrix" (consisting of Lauren Christy, Scott Spock and Graham Edwards) to produce songs for Duff's debut album Metamorphosis (2003). "So Yesterday" became one of three songs produced by the team for the album, and was the last song recorded for the album. Duff herself has said that when she first heard the song, she did not really like it; however, her opinion changed after she listened to it more often. She then decided she would give the song a "100 percent" and not comment negatively of it. According to her, she "ended up loving it", stating, "It was such a fun song, and it means a lot." Bob Cavallo, chairman of Buena Vista Records, said that the song was "more mature than the past work that she's done."

"So Yesterday" premiered on AOL Music's "First Listen" on June 27, 2003, and it drew over 500,000 streams in two days. It was released to mainstream radio in the United States on July 15, and was the "most added" song on the format in its first two weeks of release. The song is featured on all of Duff's compilations album, including Most Wanted (2005), 4ever (2006) and her greatest hits album, Best of Hilary Duff (2008). It is also featured on the music video game Band Hero as a bonus download.

Composition

Lyrically, the song talks about someone who has got over a broken relationship, declaring the partner as "so yesterday". According to Duff, the song's lyrics are very empowering towards breaking up with someone and getting over it. In a 2006 interview with Instinct, Duff said that people often told her that "So Yesterday" was "the ultimate post-breakup anthem". She said her mother instilled the notion of inner strength in her, and that she wanted the music she makes to be positive. "I don't think there's very much of that out there anymore.", she said. She stressed the importance of strong songs that are not all about how "a boy broke your heart and you're never going to get on your feet again", saying it was good for girls to hear.

Musically, "So Yesterday" is moderately paced, with influences of pop and rock music and moves at a tempo of 76 bpm. The song is set in the signature of common time, and is written in the key of C major. The song has the sequence of Am–G–Fmaj7 as its chord progression. Duff's vocal range in the song spans from the note of G3 to the note of A4.

Critical reception
Upon its release, the song received mixed to positive reviews from critics. Stephen Thomas Erlewine of AllMusic gave a positive review and commented that the song sounded natural coming from a teenager like Duff. He also noted the influence of Avril Lavigne on the song. Billboard gave a mixed review, also commenting on Lavigne's influence on the song. Similarly, Spence D. of IGN Music was mixed in his review stating, "[it's] like bubblegum ice cream: smooth and sweet at first listen, but the flavor eventually wears off, leaving somewhat generic pop anthems that will most likely be forgotten by the aforementioned throngs of young girl worshippers as they age along with Duff." While reviewing Duff's compilation Most Wanted, Talia Kraines of BBC Music commented that the song was Duff's best. Similarly, Sal Cinquemani of Slant Magazine, noted the track as "kind of cute." Elysa Gardner of USA Today gave a negative review on the song's title writing, "[That] song title may, unfortunately, prove prophetic for an artist who seems so content to merely ride the wave of the moment".

Commercial performance
"So Yesterday" debuted on the Billboard Hot 100 of August 16, 2003, at number 53 and eventually peaked at number 42. It spent 20 weeks on the Hot 100. The song topped the US Billboard Hot 100 Singles Sales chart, making Duff the first artist in four months not affiliated with American Idol to top the chart. The song peaked at number two in Canadian Singles Chart. In Australia, the song debuted at number 39, peaked at number eight in its eighth week, and remained on the chart for 20 weeks. It was the 49th-best-selling single of 2003 in Australia, and was certified platinum in 2004. In United Kingdom, the song debuted at number nine on the UK Singles Chart. The song peaked within the top 10 on the charts in other European countries such as Ireland, the Netherlands, and France. As of July 27, 2014, the song had sold 252,000 digital copies in the United States.

Music video
The music video premiered on MTV on July 24, 2003. It was directed by Chris Applebaum. It was also featured on MTV's Making the Video two days after the video's premiere on July 26, 2003. According to Disney Music Group chairman Bob Cavallo, care was taken to see that the video would not be offensive to Duff's young fans and parents, but would work for MTV.

In the video, Duff's plays a break-up prank on her aloof boyfriend. While he is at the beach, she steals his clothes, including an orange T-shirt that reads "Everything is bigger in Texas!". She spends several days taking snapshots of strangers wearing the T-shirt and anonymously sneaking them into his mailbox. His bewilderment turns to dismay when he receives the final package returning the garment along with a picture of Duff smiling, looking back, and wearing a shirt that declares, "you're so yesterday". Throughout the whole video, Duff is shown performing the song with her band. The music video ranked at number one on Total Request Live. It was a staple on the UK incarnation of Total Request Live, reaching a peak of number four. In late August 2003 it was the most streamed music video on AOL.

Live performances
"So Yesterday" was performed at the 31st American Music Awards in November 2003. The song was also performed at the British chart program Top of the Pops in 2003. Duff performed an acoustic version of the song at Sessions@AOL and Studio Disney. Apart from the live television performances, the song was performed on many of Duff's tours. "So Yesterday" was performed on every show on her Metamorphosis Tour (2003). The live acoustic performance at Sessions@AOL was taped and is featured on Duff's video compilation All Access Pass, and the performance at the Metamorphosis tour is featured on Duff's live video compilation The Girl Can Rock.

Track listings

 American, Canadian and Japanese CD single
 "So Yesterday"  – 3:33
 "Workin' It Out"  – 3:20

 French and German CD single
 "So Yesterday"  – 3:34
 "So Yesterday" (Thunderpuss mix)  – 4:17

 Australian CD maxi single
 "So Yesterday"  – 3:34
 "So Yesterday" (Thunderpuss mix)  – 4:16
 "So Yesterday" (dance mix)  – 3:37
 "Workin' It Out"  – 3:21
 "So Yesterday" (video)

 UK CD maxi single 1 and German CD maxi single
 "So Yesterday"  – 3:37
 "Girl Can Rock"  – 3:10
 "Metamorphosis Megamix"  – 5:33

 UK CD maxi single 2 and French CD maxi single
 "So Yesterday"  – 3:36
 "Workin' It Out"  – 3:17
 "So Yesterday" (Thunderpuss mix)  – 4:18

Credits and personnel
Credits and personnel are adapted from the Metamorphosis album liner notes.

 Hilary Duff – lead vocals
 The Matrix – production, arrangement, recording, mixing
 Lauren Christy – songwriting
 Scott Spock – songwriting
 Graham Edwards – songwriting
 Charlie Midnight – songwriting
 Stephen Marcussen – mastering

Charts

Weekly charts

Year-end charts

Certifications

Release history

References

2003 singles
Hilary Duff songs
Hollywood Records singles
Music videos directed by Chris Applebaum
Song recordings produced by the Matrix (production team)
Songs written by Charlie Midnight
Songs written by Graham Edwards (musician)
Songs written by Lauren Christy
Songs written by Scott Spock